Jozef Škrlík (born 2 October 1962 in Humenné) is a former football player from Slovakia and currently assistant manager of Latvian club FK Jelgava. He managed also Kazakhstan U21 and Kazakh team FC Akzhayik.

External links
 1. FC Tatran Prešov profile

References

1962 births
Living people
Slovak footballers
Slovak football managers
Slovak expatriate footballers
Association football midfielders
ŠK Futura Humenné players
FC Hradec Králové players
Sportspeople from Humenné
FC Akzhayik managers